Michurinsk is the second most populous town in Tambov Oblast, Russia. Population:

History
Originally known as Kozlov, it was founded in 1635 at the northern end of the emerging Belgorod Line, a frontier defense line.   A  earthen wall was built eastward across the open steppe effectively blocking the Nogai Trail, a Tatar raiding route. The success of this line led to the building of further lines further south. The settlement was granted town status in 1779.

The town was renamed Michurinsk in 1932 after the biologist Ivan Michurin, who had developed a genetic laboratory and agricultural testing fields in the Tambov region, dedicated to pomology (the study of fruit growing) and selection.

Administrative and municipal status
Within the framework of administrative divisions, Michurinsk serves as the administrative center of Michurinsky District, even though it is not a part of it. As an administrative division, it is incorporated separately as the town of oblast significance of Michurinsk—an administrative unit with the status equal to that of the districts. As a municipal division, the town of oblast significance of Michurinsk is incorporated as Michurinsk Urban Okrug.

Military
The town is home to Michurinsk air base.

Twin towns – sister cities

Michurinsk is twinned with:
 Munster, Germany
 Smolyan, Bulgaria

References

Notes

Sources

Brian L. Davies, State Power and Community in Early Modern Russia: The Case of Kozlov, 1635-1649 (Basingstoke, Palgrave Macmillan, 2004).

External links

Photos of Michurinsk 
News of culture and sport in Michurinsk 

Cities and towns in Tambov Oblast
Kozlovsky Uyezd
Naukograds